Three ships of the Royal Navy have borne the name HMS Torrington, while the name has also been used for one ship of the navy during the Commonwealth period:

 Torrington was a 62-gun ship launched in 1654. She was renamed  in 1660, and foundered in 1690.
Charles Galley was renamed Torrington in 1729, was hulked in 1740 and sold in 1744.
  was a 44-gun fifth rate launched in 1743 and sold in 1763.
  was a  launched in 1943 under lend-lease, and returned to the US Navy in 1946.

Royal Navy ship names